Ville de Québec is the French wording for Quebec City (direct translation: City of Québec) and may also refer to:
HMCS Ville de Quebec, naval vessels named after the city
HMCS Ville de Québec (FFH 332), the second and current vessel- a Halifax class frigate

See also
 Name of Quebec City
 Quebec City (disambiguation)
 Quebec (disambiguation)